Elnur Aslanov (2 January 1983 – June 2012) was an Azerbaijani wrestler. He competed in the men's freestyle 74 kg at the 2004 Summer Olympics.

References

External links
 

1983 births
2012 deaths
Azerbaijani male sport wrestlers
Olympic wrestlers of Azerbaijan
Wrestlers at the 2004 Summer Olympics
Sportspeople from Baku
20th-century Azerbaijani people